The nominees for the 2009 Ovation Awards were announced on October 19, 2009, at A Noise Within in Glendale, California.  The awards were presented for excellence in stage productions in the Los Angeles area from September 1, 2008, to August 31, 2009, based upon evaluations from members of the Los Angeles theater community.

The winners were announced on January 11, 2010, in a ceremony at the Redondo Beach Performing Arts Center in Redondo Beach, California.

Awards 
Winners are listed first and highlighted in boldface.

References 

Ovation Awards
Ovation
2009 in California
2009 awards in the United States